Tītahi Bay (previously known as Titahi Bay), a suburb of Porirua in the North Island of New Zealand, lies at the foot of a short peninsula on the west coast of the Porirua Harbour, to the north of Porirua city centre.

History
The legendary Polynesian navigator Kupe landed at Komanga Point, 3 kilometres west of Titahi Bay, leaving an anchor stone which today can be seen at the Museum of New Zealand Te Papa Tongarewa.

The area was settled by Māori for many years before the arrival of Europeans, and several pa sites are located nearby. The area was also the site of many inter-iwi conflicts, notably in the 1820s, when the area was invaded by the followers of Te Rauparaha.

The first European residents were whalers operating from Korohiwa, between Titahi Bay and Komanga Point.

During World War II, a camp housing US military personnel was built in Titahi Bay.

In December 2010, the name of the suburb was officially changed to Tītahi Bay.

Demographics

Tītahi Bay had a population of 6,432 at the 2018 New Zealand census, an increase of 411 people (6.8%) since the 2013 census, and an increase of 753 people (13.3%) since the 2006 census. There were 2,247 households. There were 3,105 males and 3,327 females, giving a sex ratio of 0.93 males per female, with 1,536 people (23.9%) aged under 15 years, 1,251 (19.4%) aged 15 to 29, 2,889 (44.9%) aged 30 to 64, and 756 (11.8%) aged 65 or older.

Ethnicities were 67.5% European/Pākehā 36.1% Māori, 19.6% Pacific peoples, 8.0% Asian, and 2.8% other ethnicities (totals add to more than 100% since people could identify with multiple ethnicities).

The proportion of people born overseas was 16.9%, compared with 27.1% nationally.

Although some people objected to giving their religion, 50.9% had no religion, 34.7% were Christian, 1.6% were Hindu, 0.4% were Muslim, 0.7% were Buddhist and 4.3% had other religions.

Of those at least 15 years old, 1,014 (20.7%) people had a bachelor or higher degree, and 906 (18.5%) people had no formal qualifications. The employment status of those at least 15 was that 2,538 (51.8%) people were employed full-time, 609 (12.4%) were part-time, and 330 (6.7%) were unemployed.

Features

Titahi Bay Beach

Titahi Bay is one kilometre from end to end and forms a bay.

Surfing is a popular activity at Titahi Bay. Titahi Bay is a beach break that can be surfed on all tides and during periods of onshore winds is generally the time to go there. The surf breaks have a vast array of size and skill sets, from the Rocks (1.5–2 m) to the famous Locals (1-2m) to the Fishermans (inside 2-3m, outside 3-5m) mainly all from a northwesterly swell direction. This all changes when the south swell arrives, with different breaks from different swell directions. A surfing club has operated for over 30 years. Two NZ champions originate from the area. The Titahi Bay Surf Life Saving Club is located in the centre of the bay.

The boat sheds at the northern and southern ends of the beach are often featured in photographs of the area. 

The fossilised remains of a forest from the Pleistocene era are located at Titahi Bay and form an intertidal reef. The forest was dominated by podocarps and tree-ferns and dates from the last interglacial period 150,000–70,000 years ago.

Titahi Bay Volunteer Fire Brigade

Founded in 1945, the Titahi Bay Volunteer Fire Brigade operates an Iveco EuroCargo ML120E Type 2 (Medium Pump) Appliance and currently has 20 volunteer firefighters. The Titahi Bay Volunteer Fire Brigade operates in the New Zealand Fire Service's Fire Region 3.

Porirua Little Theatre
It was founded in 1950 as Titahi Bay Little Theatre by Ellinore Ginn, in the recreation hall used by US Marines encamped at Titahi Bay during World War II.

Transport
Bus routes servicing Titahi Bay:

Route 210

Runs between Titahi Bay and Johnsonville Railway Station.

Route 220

Runs between Titahi Bay and Ascot Park.

Education

Primary schools

Titahi Bay School is a co-educational state primary school for Year 1 to 6 students, Titahi Bay North School is a co-educational state primary school for Year 1 to 8 students, and Ngati Toa School is a co-educational state primary school for Year 1 to 6 students.

Intermediate schools

Location in films 

Many location shots in the 2007 Taika Waititi film Eagle vs Shark originated in Tītahi Bay.

Sports
Sporting organisations in Titahi Bay:
Titahi Bay Boating Club 
Titahi Bay Bowling Club
Titahi Bay Golf Club
Titahi Bay Surf Life Saving Club
Titahi Bay Tennis Club
Titahi Bay Boxing Club
Titahi Bay Surfers (Porirua Surfing Troupe Inc.)
Titahi Bay Fishermans Club

Rock climbing
The cliffs along Titahi Bay have a history of rock climbing. Titahi Bay became the most popular rock-climbing spot in the Wellington area in the 1940s.

Notable people

Ron Farrell, rugby league player
Sean Wade, Olympic runner
Michael Campbell, international golfer
Gary McCormick, radio and TV personality
Emmett Skilton, film and television actor
Lynnette Brooky, sportsperson
Tamati Ellison, sportsperson

See also
 George French Angas
 Titahi Bay Transmitter

References

External links

 Titahi Bay webcam
 Titahi Golf Club

 
Suburbs of Porirua
Bays of the Wellington Region